James Buis Richards Jr. (October 28, 1946 – March 8, 2022) was an American football defensive back in the National Football League. After attending Virginia Tech, Richards played for the New York Jets in 1968 and 1969. He was a member of the Super Bowl III winning Jets team.

Richards died on March 8, 2022, at the age of 75.

References

External links
Pro-Football reference

1946 births
2022 deaths
American football defensive backs
New York Jets players
Virginia Tech Hokies football players
Players of American football from Charlotte, North Carolina